The 38th (Irish) Brigade, is a brigade formation of the British Army that served in the Second World War. It was composed of North Irish line infantry regiments and served with distinction in the Tunisian and Italian Campaigns.  Following the end of the war, the brigade was disbanded, but was reformed in sixty years later in 2007 and remains the regional formation for Northern Ireland.

Second World War
The 38th Infantry Brigade came into existence on 13 January 1942 by the re-designation of the 210th Independent Infantry Brigade (Home), a Home Defence formation organised in October 1940. The 210th Brigade had been serving in the Dorset County Division. When that division was disbanded on 24 November 1941, 210 Brigade transferred to the 1st Infantry Division. By then, all of 210 Brigade's English home defence battalions had been posted away and were replaced by the 1st Battalion, Royal Irish Fusiliers, the 6th Battalion, Royal Inniskilling Fusiliers and the 2nd Battalion, London Irish Rifles. Of the three battalions, only the 1st Royal Irish Fusiliers had seen active service, fighting in the Battle of France where they were forced to retreat to Dunkirk and were subsequently evacuated to England.

In June 1942, the brigade was transferred from the 1st Infantry Division to the 6th Armoured Division and it landed in North Africa with the division on 22 November 1942, as part of the British First Army. In March 1943, it exchanged with the 1st Guards Brigade and joined the 78th Battleaxe Infantry Division and fought with distinction throughout the rest of the Tunisian Campaign. In late April, the 38th (Irish) Brigade played a lead role in the capture of the German defensive positions in the mountains north of Medjez-el-Bab and the campaign ended in mid-May, with almost 250,000 Axis soldiers surrendering. The brigade were the first marching troops to enter Tunis on 8 May 1943.

After a short rest, the brigade again saw action in the Allied invasion of Sicily (in particular the capture of Centuripe), and in the Italian Campaign, spearheading the British Eighth Army's advance to the Volturno Line, and later at the Battle of Monte Cassino and at Lake Trasimene. Shortly afterwards, the brigade was sent to rest in Egypt. While there, the 6th Inniskillings was disbanded and the men transferred to the 2nd Battalion, another Regular Army unit, which had arrived from 13th Brigade of the 5th Division, and the surplus men were transferred to fill gaps in the other battalions of the brigade.

The rest was short-lived, however, and the brigade soon returned to Italy where it was involved in fighting north of Florence, followed later by Operation Grapeshot. During May 1945, it was (briefly) detached to both 46th Infantry and 6th Armoured Divisions and the brigade then was allotted occupation duties in Carinthia in southern Austria, before being formally disbanded in April 1947.

Order of battle
The 38th Brigade was constituted as follows during the war:
 1st Battalion, Royal Irish Fusiliers
 2nd Battalion, London Irish Rifles
 6th Battalion, Royal Inniskilling Fusiliers (disbanded 5 August 1944)
 2nd Battalion, Royal Inniskilling Fusiliers (from 26 July 1944)

Commanders
The following officers commanded the 38th Brigade during the war:
 Brigadier Morgan O'Donovan (12 January 1942 – 1 July 1942)
 Brigadier Nelson Russell (1 July 1942 – 20 February 1944)
 Brigadier Thomas (Pat) Scott (from 20 February 1944)

Formations served under
Formations that the brigade served under included:
 1st Infantry Division 25 November 1941 – 7 June 1942
 6th Armoured Division 9 June 1942 – 16 February 1943
 'Y" Division 16 Feb 43 – 15 March 1943
 78th Infantry Division 15 March 1943 – 28 March 1943
 46th Infantry Division 29 March 1943 – 6 April 1943
 78th Infantry Division 7 April 1943 – 10 May 1945
 6th Armoured Division 10 May 1945 – 13 May 1945
 46th Infantry Division 13 May 1945 – 18 May 1945
 78th Infantry Division 18 May 1945 – 31 August 1945

Twenty-first century 
38th (Irish) Brigade reformed on 1 August 2007, as part of a new combined divisional / brigade structure called HQ Northern Ireland and 38th (Irish) Brigade after the disbandment of HQ Northern Ireland and has its headquarters at Thiepval Barracks in Lisburn.

The 38th Brigade subsequently came under command of the 2nd Division, the regional division for Scotland, the North of England and Northern Ireland, on 1 January 2009.  it was now the regional brigade responsible for administering the Army within Northern Ireland. This was the culmination of a drawdown of military headquarters in Northern Ireland, which had seen the disbandment of 3rd Infantry Brigade, 8th Infantry Brigade, 39th Infantry Brigade and 107th (Ulster) Brigade.

Today the Army Reserve soldiers from the brigade have served on operations supporting the Regular Army in the Balkans, on Operation TOSCA in Cyprus, on Operation HERRICK in Afghanistan and Operation TELIC in Iraq.  At home the Brigade has the key role of providing the Civil Contingency Reaction Force for Northern Ireland. The Brigade Headquarters is also regionally aligned with the Republic of Ireland as part of defence engagement.

Current organisation
Under the Army 2020 programme, 38th (Irish) Brigade moved from 2nd Division to 1st (United Kingdom) Division   and was reorganised into an infantry brigade with three units: Royal Scots Borderers, 1st Battalion Royal Regiment of Scotland, 2nd Battalion The Rifles, and 7th Battalion, The Rifles all in the light infantry role.

However, under the Army 2020 Refine, the brigade was completely reorganised.  The following changes occurred: Royal Scots Borderers, 1st Battalion Royal Regiment of Scotland moved to the Specialised Infantry Group; 1st Battalion, Royal Anglian Regiment joined from 7th Infantry Brigade as Light Mechanised Infantry; 7th Battalion, The Rifles joined 20th Armoured Infantry Brigade; and the 8th Battalion, The Rifles was formed and joined the brigade in 2018 as light infantry.

Under the 2019 Field Army reorganisations, the brigade dropped its infantry commitments with the units moving to other commands: 2nd and 8th Battalions, The Rifles joining 51st Infantry Brigade, and 1st Battalion, Royal Anglian Regiment re-joining 7th Infantry Brigade.

 38th (Irish) Brigade, at Thiepval Barracks, Lisburn
 Queen's University Officers' Training Corps (Army Reserve), at Tyrone House, Belfast
 Army Cadet Force
 38th (Irish) Brigade Cadet Training Team, at Palace Barracks, Holywood
 1st Northern Ireland Battalion, Army Cadet Force, in Belfast
 2nd Northern Ireland Battalion, Army Cadet Force, in Belfast

References

Bibliography

External links
 38 (Irish) Brigade
 The Long, Long Trail
 Irish Brigade The Story of the 38th (Irish) Brigade during the Second World A website containing information and eyewitness accounts. The site also has , the story of the Irish Brigade written by TPD Scott, who commanded the brigade from February 1944 until the end of the war.

Infantry brigades of the British Army
Infantry brigades of the British Army in World War II
Military units and formations established in 1942
Military units and formations established in 2007
British Army Regional Points of Command